This article presents a list of the historical events and publications of Australian literature during 2017.

Major publications

Literary fiction
 Peter Carey – A Long Way from Home
Felicity Castagna – No More Boats
 J. M. Coetzee – The Schooldays of Jesus
 Michelle de Kretser — The Life to Come
 Robert Drewe — Whipbird
 Richard Flanagan – First Person
 Sofie Laguna — The Choke
Catherine McKinnon – Storyland: The land is a book, waiting to be read
 Alex Miller — The Passage of Love
 Bram Presser — The Book of Dirt
 Kim Scott — Taboo

Children's and Young Adult fiction
 Judith Clarke – My Lovely Frankie
Zana Fraillon – The Ones That Disappeared 
 Morris Gleitzman – Maybe (sequel to Once, Then, Now, After, Soon)
 Andy Griffiths – The Tree House Fun Book 2 and The 91-Storey Treehouse
 Jessica Townsend – Nevermoor: The Trials of Morrigan Crow

Crime
 Sulari Gentill — Crossing the Lines
 Jane Harper – Force of Nature
 Michael Robotham — The Secrets She Keeps

Science Fiction, Fantasy and Speculative fiction
 Claire G. Coleman – Terra Nullius
Jane Rawson – From the Wreck

Poetry
 Michael Farrell – I Love Poetry
 Bella Li – Argosy
 Alan Wearne – These Things Are Real
 Fiona Wright – Domestic Interiors

Drama
 Tommy Murphy – Mark Colvin's Kidney

Biographies
 Judith Brett — The Enigmatic Mr Deakin

Non-fiction
 Peter FitzSimons – Burke and Wills: The Triumph and Tragedy of Australia's Most Famous Explorers
 Kate Grenville – The Case Against Fragrance
 John Safran – Depends What You Mean by Extremist
 Alexis Wright – Tracker

Awards and honours

Note: these awards were presented in the year in question.

Lifetime achievement

Fiction

National

Children and Young Adult

National

Crime and Mystery

International

National

Science Fiction

Non-Fiction

Poetry

Drama

Deaths

 12 January – Jill Roe, historian, academic and author (born 1940)
 10 March – Bill Leak, editorial and political cartoonist, caricaturist and portraitist (born 1956)
 9 April – John Clarke, comedian, writer and satirist (born 1948)
 22 April – Donna Williams, writer, artist, singer-songwriter, screenwriter and sculptor (born 1963)
 2 May – Michael Gurr, playwright, author, speech writer and screenwriter (born 1961)
 3 May – Rosie Scott, novelist and lecturer (born 1948)
26 June – Jimmy Chi, playwright and composer (born 1948)
 27 June – Rae Desmond Jones, poet, novelist, short story writer and politician (born 1941)
 2 July – Fay Zwicky, poet, short-story writer, critic and academic best known for her autobiographical poem Kaddish, about her identity as a Jewish writer (born 1933)
 3 August – Jack Wodhams, science fiction writer (born 1931)
 7 November – Sylvia Lawson, historian, journalist and critic (born 1932)
 1 December – Ken Inglis, historian (born 1929)
 22 December – Lilith Norman, children's writer and editor (born 1927)

See also
 Literature
 List of years in Australian literature
 List of Australian literary awards

References

Literature
Australian literature by year
Years of the 21st century in Australia
Years of the 21st century in literature